The 1899 Manitoba general election was held on December 7, 1899. The Conservative Party, led by Sir Hugh John Macdonald defeated the incumbent Liberal government, led by Premier Thomas Greenway.

References 

1899
1899 elections in Canada
1899 in Manitoba
December 1899 events